Sambhaji II or Sambhaji I of Kolhapur (1698 -  18 December 1760) was a Raja of Kolhapur from  Bhonsle dynasty. He was a grandson of Shivaji and the second son of Chhatrapati Rajaram with his second wife, Rajasbai.
After defeat by Shahu, Sambhaji's  stepmother, Tarabai then set up a rival court in Kolhapur with her son Shivaji II as Raja of Kolhapur in 1710, who then ruled as Shivaji I of Kolhapur line. However, in 1714, Rajasbai instigated a coup against Tarabai and  installed her own son, Sambhaji II (titled as Sambhaji I of Kolhapur) on the Kolhapur throne. Sambhaji ruled from 1714 to  1760.

In early years of his rule, Sambhaji  made alliance with the Nizam to wrest the Maratha kingdom from his cousin, Shahu. The defeat of the Nizam by Bajirao I in the Battle of Palkhed in 1728  led to the former ending his support for Sambhaji. This conflict formally came to an end in 1731 when the treaty of Warna was signed by the two sides. With this treaty both sides recognized each other claims with Shahu ceding territory between the Krishna and Tungabhadra rivers to Sambhaji. He, however, had to remain a vassal of Shahu. He was succeeded by Jijibai as a regent of Shivaji II of Kolhapur.

References

Sources

Maharajas of Kolhapur
1698 births
1760 deaths